The Adoration of the Magi is a 1517 triptych by the Early Netherlandish painter Jacob Cornelisz. van Oostsanen in the collection of the Rijksmuseum.

Central panel
Mary sits with her child in front of a ruined gateway dated 1517. She holds the Christ Child who leans towards King Melchior to receive a kiss on His hand. Melchior has removed his crown and laid down his gift, a golden covered beaker. On the right King Casper holds his covered beaker of frankincense and on the left King Balthazar holds his gift, an orb of myrrh. Behind him, a line of men holding weapons stretches around the manger. The men are presumably the combined entourages of the Three Kings, who are in conversation with each other and seem oblivious of the scene in the center.

Wings
The painting is still accompanied by its original wings. On the left wing are the donor with his six sons and Saint Jerome, his patron saint. The man’s wife is depicted on the right wing with Saint Catherine of Alexandria and seven daughters. At the tops of the wings are the donors’ coats of arms. The outer wings are painted in grisaille with Saint Christopher on the left and Saint Anthony Abbot on the right, with two more coats of arms. In its opened state, the three paintings do not appear to fit with each other and may have been painted at different times. The children behind the donors wearing white shrouds are assumed to have had died before the painting was finished. Due to a lack of secure documentation, attribution was only established in the 20th century to Oostsanen based on underdrawings and comparison to his other works. The portrayed donors have been variously named due to a combination of genealogical research and identification of the coats of arms. Part of the documentation problem is not knowing whether the shrouded children were recorded as baptized or not. Currently RKDimages states that the left wing shows Claes Bouwensz. Cat (died 1536) with Saint Jerome and the right wing shows Volckgen Jansdr. with Saint Catherine of Alexandria.

Provenance
This painting was purchased in 1978 with support from the Prins Bernard Fonds and Vereniging Rembrandt from Mr and Mrs J. William Middendorf II for 1,145,833 guilders. It was purchased by King Willem II sometime before 1823 as by Jan Gossaert and was sold subsequently as by Hans Memling and catalogued in 1841 as Lucas van Leyden and in 1926 as by a Jan van Hout, documented in the workshop of the Master of Alkmaar, before being attributed to Jacob van Oostsanen by Max Jakob Friedländer in 1935. The painting's documentation goes no further back than to a Franciscan convent near Messiera in 1792.

Other versions
Other versions exist but are no longer accompanied by wings.

References 

 Schatten uit het Rijksmuseum, by Emile Meijer, 1985, page 37
 Rijkmuseum Amsterdam: Les merveilles de la collection, editor Theo Schoemaker, 1992, page 11

1517 paintings
Paintings in the collection of the Rijksmuseum
Oostsanen
Paintings of the Madonna and Child